Rakhi is a 1962 Indian Hindi-language drama film directed by A. Bhimsingh and starring Ashok Kumar, Waheeda Rehman, Pradeep Kumar and Mehmood. A major success, This film had Kumar winning the Filmfare Award for Best Actor for his performance and screenwriter K. P. Kottarakara won the Filmfare Award for Best Story. It was nominated for a Filmfare Award for Best Movie and Mehmood was nominated for the Filmfare Award for Best Supporting Actor. The film was shot at Neptune Studios in Chennai. This film was a remake of the Tamil film Pasamalar. Pasamalar was remade in Telugu as Rakta Sambandham, which went on to be remade again in Hindi as Aisa Pyaar Kahan.

Cast
Ashok Kumar as Raj Kumar "Raju"
Pradeep Kumar as Anand
Waheeda Rehman as	Radha
Mehmood as Kasturi
Madan Puri as Advocate Ramesh Chandra
Raj Mehra as Raju's Boss
Randhir as Shankar 
Shivraj as Bhagwandas Chaudhary
Mohan Choti as Mohan 		
Ameeta as Malti Chandra
Malika as Rani
Lalita Pawar as Nandini

Music
All lyrics are written by Rajinder Krishan.

References

External links
 

1962 films
1960s Hindi-language films
Hindi remakes of Tamil films
Films directed by A. Bhimsingh
Films scored by Ravi